A māripi is a type of knife consisting of carved wood with shark teeth embedded in it. It was traditionally made by Māori, the indigenous people of New Zealand. It was used for cutting meat, and not generally as a weapon.

References

External links
A māripi in the collection of the Museum of New Zealand Te Papa Tongarewa

Knives
Māori culture